Neu! is a German krautrock band.

Neu or NEU may also refer to:

Education 
 National Economics University, Hanoi, Vietnam
 National Education Union, a British teaching trade union
 Near East University, Lefkosa, Northern Cyprus
 New Era University, Quezon City, Philippines
 Northeastern University, Boston, Massachusetts, United States
 Northeastern University (China), Shenyang, Liaoning

Music 
 Neu, an album by Polysics
 Neu! (album), debut album by Neu!

People with the surname 
 Alexander Neu, German politician
 Anne Neu, American politician first elected 2017

Science 
 HER2/neu, an oncogene
 Neuraminic acid